Artur Yaroslavovych Vashchyshyn (born 11 June 2000) is a Ukrainian professional footballer who plays as a right back for Zviahel.

Career
Born in Dubno, Vashchyshyn began his career in the neighbouring youth football academy BRV-VIK Volodymyr and after continued in the Dynamo Kyiv youth sportive school.

He played in the Ukrainian Premier League Reserves and never made his debut for the senior Dynamo Kyiv's squad. In summer of 2018 Vashchyshyn was injured during training (tear of meniscus) and had a surgery.

In March 2021 Vashchyshyn signed a half-year loan contract with the Ukrainian First League's side Chornomorets Odesa and in July 2021 changed the loan team, and was transferred to another Ukrainian First League club, Podillya Khmelnytskyi.

His professional debut Vashchyshyn made in the Ukrainian First League for Chornomorets on 5 April 2021 in a home match against Prykarpattia when he came out on 67th minute as a substitute for Maksym Melnychuk. In total Vashchyshyn played only three games for the Odessa club, while being listed often for games as a substitute. After Chornomorets was promoted to the top tier, Vashchyshyn remained to play in the First League for Podillia. His debut for the club from Khmelnytskyi, Vashchyshyn made in the away match against regional rivals Epitsentr on 18 August 2021.

References

External links
 
 

2000 births
Living people
People from Dubno
Ukrainian footballers
Association football midfielders
Ukraine youth international footballers
FC Dynamo Kyiv players
FC Chornomorets Odesa players
FC Podillya Khmelnytskyi players
FC Zvyahel Novohrad-Volynskyi players
Ukrainian First League players
Ukrainian Second League players
Sportspeople from Rivne Oblast